Novoyumranovo (Yañı Yomran) is a rural locality (a village) in Chekmagushevsky District, Bashkortostan, Russia. The population was 55 as of 2010. There is 1 street.

Geography 
Novoyumranovo is located 31 km east of Chekmagush (the district's administrative centre) by road. Novokalmashevo is the nearest rural locality.

References 

Rural localities in Chekmagushevsky District